Ken Rose (born May 16, 1986) is a Canadian former competitive figure skater. He is the 2006 Merano Cup champion and 2003 Canadian junior national champion. He won a pair of bronze medals on the ISU Junior Grand Prix circuit and placed 13th at the 2004 World Junior Championships. Rose began skating at age seven and was coached by Linda Bridge for many years. He later trained at the Mariposa School of Skating under Doug Leigh.

After retiring from competition, Rose became a skating coach at the Richmond Training Centre in Richmond Hill, Ontario. His wife, Danielle, is also a coach at the club.

Programs

Competitive highlights

References

External links
 

Canadian male single skaters
Sportspeople from Newmarket, Ontario
1986 births
Living people